Wolfram is both a given name and surname of Germanic origin. It is composed as wolf ‘wolf’ + hrafn ‘raven’, important in Germanic mythology.

Given name 
 Wulfram of Sens (c. 640–703), Merovingian saint
 Wolfram von Eschenbach (1170–1220), German writer
 Wolfram von Richthofen (1895-1945), German field marshal general of the Luftwaffe during World War II
 Wolfram Waibel Jr. (born 1970), Austrian sport shooter
 Wolfram Saenger (born 1939),  German biochemist and crystallographer
 Wolfram Sievers (1905-1948), German Holocaust perpetrator and manager of the Ahnenerbe, executed for war crimes
 Wolfram Wuttke (1961–2015), German footballer

Surname 
 Conrad Wolfram (born 1970), British technologist and businessman, brother of Stephen Wolfram
 Donald Justin Wolfram (1919–2003), American religious leader
 Gary L. Wolfram, American economist
 Herwig Wolfram, Austrian historian
 Hugo Wolfram (1925–2015), an English businessman and novelist
 Joy Wolfram  (born 1989), Finnish nanoscientist
 Joseph Maria Wolfram (1789–1839), Bohemian composer and politician
 Maria Wolfram (born 1961), Finnish visual artist
 Martin Wolfram (born 1992), German diver
 Ralf-Reimar Wolfram (1912–1945), German sailor
 Stephen Wolfram (born 1959), British computer scientist and entrepreneur

 Sybil Wolfram (1931–1993), a philosopher, mother of Stephen
 Walt Wolfram (born 1941), American sociolinguist and former president of the Linguistic Society of America

Fictional
 Wolfram von Bielefeld, a character in Kyo Kara Maoh!, a series of light novels

See also
 
 Wolfram & Hart, a fictional law firm in the 1999 television series Angel

References

German-language surnames
German masculine given names